The helmeted worm lizard (Monopeltis galeata) is a species of amphisbaenian in the family Amphisbaenidae. The species is native to the west coast of Central Africa.

Geographic range
M. galeata is found in Cameroon, Equatorial Guinea (Corisco Island), and Gabon.

Description
Specimens preserved in alcohol are whitish, both dorsally and ventrally.

Reproduction
The mode of reproduction of M. galeata is unknown.

References

Further reading
Branch WR, Pauwels OSG, Burger M (2003). "Re-discovery of Cynisca bifrontalis in Gabon, with additional notes on Monopeltis galeata (Reptilia: Amphisbaenia)". African Journal of Herpetology 52 (2): 93–100.
Gans C (2005). "Checklist and Bibliography of the Amphisbaenia of the World". Bulletin of the American Museum of Natural History (289): 1–130. (Monopeltis galeata, p. 35).
Hallowell E (1852). "Description of new species of Reptilia from Western Africa". Proceedings of the Academy of Natural Sciences of Philadelphia 6: 62–65. (Phractogonus galeatus, new species, pp. 62–63, four unnumbered figures).
Hallowell E (1857). " Notice of a collection of Reptiles from the Gaboon country, West Africa, recently presented to the Academy of Natural Sciences of Philadelphia, by Dr. Henry A. Ford". Proc. Acad. Nat. Sci. Philadelphia 9: 48–72. (Phractogonus galeatus, p. 50).

Monopeltis
Reptiles of Cameroon
Reptiles of Equatorial Guinea
Reptiles of Gabon
Reptiles described in 1852
Taxa named by Edward Hallowell (herpetologist)